Barbee may refer to:

People

Given name or nickname 
 Barbee (singer) (born 1989), Jamaican singer

Surname
 Andrew Russell Barbee Jr. (1827–1903), American surgeon
 Anita Barbee, American social psychologist
 Bud Barbee (1914–2000), American baseball player
 Carol Barbee (born 1959), American television writer, actress and producer
 Dave Barbee (1905–1968), American baseball player
 George Barbee (1850–1939), English-born American jockey
 Herbert Barbee (1848–1936), American sculptor
 John Barbee (1815—1888), the tenth Mayor of Louisville, Kentucky
 John Henry Barbee (1905–1964), American blues singer and guitarist
 Lamb Barbee (1916–1986), American baseball player
 Lloyd Barbee (1925—2002), American politician
 Rankin Barbee (1874–1958), American journalist and writer on Southern history
 Tony Barbee (born 1971), American basketball coach
 William Randolph Barbee (1818–1868), American sculptor

Middle name
 Ransom B. Moore (1827–1904), California pioneer and Arizona Territory legislator

Places
United States
 Barbee, Indiana, a town 
 Barbee Lake, a lake in Indiana

See also
 Barbie (disambiguation) 
 Barby (disambiguation)
 Barbi (disambiguation)
 Barbey (disambiguation)
 Barbe (disambiguation)